Sameer Shah (sometimes known as Samir Shah) is an Indian actor best known for comedy shows. Shah's debut was in Tu Mere Agal Bagal Hai and he has also appeared in Shrimaan Shrimati Phir Se and R. K. Laxman Ki Duniya. Of his role in R. K. Laxman Ki Duniya Shah was to say that "he loves playing this role that requires a lot of focus on grammar.", while noting his character Bakulesh has magical powers.

Notes

References

Living people
Year of birth missing (living people)